Pedro Antonio Pimentel y Chamorro (born 1830 – died Quartier-Morin, 1874) was a Dominican military figure and politician.  He served as the 9th president of the Dominican Republic from March 25, 1865 until August 4, of that year.  He also served as governor of Santiago de los Caballeros, Minister of War, and as a deputy of the Congress of the Dominican Republic.
He was born to father Jacinto Pimentel and mother Juana Chamorro. He died sick and without any money in Quartier-Morin, Haiti in 1874.

Political life
His public life commenced in Capotillo. He was a cattle farmer and had a significant fortune. He held several public appointments, ranging from army posts to President of the Republic. He was imprisoned in 1863 next to Lucas Evangelista and several others on the failed revolutionary attempt against Spanish annexation.
He escaped from jail and sought refuge in Haiti. After the proclamation of Capotillo he immediately joined the military aspect of the revolution.
He was later promoted to Chief General of the Eastern Forces, and subsequently moved to the Northwest Line as Chief Delegate of Operations in that region.
He was named governor of Santiago on 10 February 1864, after which he immediately set out to fight in Puerto Plata, to the aid of Gaspar Polanco at the time chasing retreating Spanish troops towards that sea port. In January 1865 he was made Minister of War and chosen as representative for Santiago at the National Assembly that was meeting in revolutionary-held territory.

President of the Dominican Republic
He was chosen President of the Dominican Republic on 25 March 1865. One of his first commands was the designation of a war council to try Gaspar Polanco (ex President) and his cabinet.
The Restoration War ended during his mandate.

References
Antonio Pimentel Biography at the Enciclopedia Virtual Dominicana

External links
 

|-

1830 births
1874 deaths
People from Monte Cristi Province
Presidents of the Dominican Republic
People of the Dominican Restoration War
Government ministers of the Dominican Republic
Dominican Republic military personnel